Yau Kom Tau, sometimes transliterated as Yau Kam Tau is an area in the Tsuen Wan District of Hong Kong.

Yau Kom Tau Village and Tsuen Wan Sam Tsuen are located in this area.

Education
Yau Kom Tau is in Primary One Admission (POA) School Net 62, which includes schools in Tsuen Wan and areas nearby. The net includes multiple aided schools and one government school, Hoi Pa Street Government Primary School.

See also
 Approach Beach
 Castle Peak Road
 The Westminster Terrace
 Tsuen Wan West
 Yau Kom Tau (disambiguation)

References

Tsuen Wan District